Lamput is an Indian animated television series of shorts created by Vaibhav Kumaresh and produced by Vaibhav Studios for Cartoon Network Asia, consisting of 15 seconds micro shorts that were extended to 2 minutes for the second season. Season 3 consists of episodes ranging from 3 to 5 minutes, as well as 7-minute specials, airing on Cartoon Network in Asia, EMEA, Latin America and USA. Lamput has also started airing on Boomerang worldwide.

In the United States, Lamput is broadcast via HBO Max and Cartoon Network. It was added to Max on 28 April 2022, and has started airing on Cartoon Network on 23 May 2022.

On 20 April 2021, a crossover between Lamput and Chinese internet character Tuzki was announced. It marks the premiere of the fourth season which is currently in the works.

Synopsis
Lamput is an orange gooey creature that escaped from the laboratory of Specs and Skinny. They try to catch Lamput but never succeed because of his shapeshifting ability.

Characters

Main
 Lamput: Lamput is the titular character of the show. He is an orange gooey creature that escaped from the Docs' laboratory.
 Specs: Specs, also known as Fat Doc, is the fat scientist who tries to catch Lamput.
 Skinny: Skinny, also known as Slim Doc, is the slim scientist who also tries to catch Lamput.

Supporting
 Mr. Mustache: He's a yellow fit, healthy and powerful man, often a police officer, who sometimes arrests the docs or beats them up.
 Doctor: He's a pink colored doctor who sometimes checks Lamput and the docs.
 White Lady: She is Skinny’s crush.
 Pink Lady: She is Specs’ crush.
The Boss: He is the doctors' boss.

Reception

Critical response
Lamput earned the distinction of being the first Indian show sold from a pitch bible, that has gone to air globally.

Episodes

Accolades
The show won two BAF awards, one in the category Case Study of the Year and another in the category Best Animated Episode (Indian).
Lamput Season 2 was nominated for a 2019 International Emmy Award in Kids Animation.

References 

2017 Indian television series debuts
Animated television series without speech
Cartoon Network (Indian TV channel) original programming
Indian children's animated comedy television series